Sofia Polyakova (1914–1994) was a Soviet classical philologist, Byzantine specialist and scholar of ancient Greek and Byzantine authors. She published the first collection of the works of the Russian poet Sophia Parnok and was the first scholar to unravel the relationship of Parnok and Marina Tsvetaeva. Her work on Parnok, revived scholarly interest in the poet.

Early life
Sofia Viktorovna Polyakova was born in Petrograd in 1914. Besides a brief period during World War II when she lived in Moscow, Polyakova spent her entire life in Saint Petersburg. In 1938, she graduated from Leningrad State University with a degree in classical philology. As soon as she graduated, Polyakova began working in the philology department as a teaching assistant. Between 1941 and 1944, she worked at the Soviet Information Bureau in Moscow, but when the war ended, she returned to Leningrad and resumed her position at the university. In 1945, she completed her thesis, Semantics of the imagery of the ancient historical epic (5th century BC - 1st century AD) and was promoted to an assistant professor.

Polyakova taught ancient Greek and Byzantine literature and was known as an expert on Byzantine translations, as well as Russian poets of the Silver Age. She was known as an exacting teacher and allowed her students to call on her at home for help with their studies. Polyakova shared an apartment with Irina Vladimirovna Felenkovskaya and their dogs. She taught at Leningrad University until 1972, retiring as soon as she was eligible. Though she enjoyed teaching, she preferred pursuing translations and studies of literary figures. Much of her work was not published in Russia in her lifetime, as she was neither worried about political correctness, nor the fact that some viewed her work as Eurocentric. In fact, she argued that cosmopolitanism developed a heightened sense of appreciation for one's homeland.

In 1979, Polyakova published София Парнок: Собрание стихотворения (Sophia Parnok: Collected Works), the first complete collection of the Russian poet, with Ardis Press of Ann Arbor, Michigan. The book was not published in the USSR and a Russian edition would not be released until 1998, after Polyakova's death. Then in 1983, she published Незакатные оны дни: Цветаева и Парнок (Those Unfading Days: Tsvetaeva and Parnok) also with Ardis Press, which was the first work by a scholar to identify Parnok as the woman friend in Marina Tsvetaeva's Girlfriend cycle. Later scholars of both women poets, like Diana Burgin and Simon Karlinsky drew heavily from Polyakova's work in their biographies and her scholarship revived academic interest in Parnok in both the United States and later in Russia.

Death and legacy
Polyakova died from heart disease on 30 April 1994 in Saint Petersburg. Posthumously several of her works were published and her papers were filed at the Russian State Archive of Literature and Art.

Selected works

Posthumous

Notes

References

Citations

Bibliography

 

1914 births
1994 deaths
Academic staff of Saint Petersburg State University
Soviet academics
Soviet writers